Lisball is a townland near Bailieborough, County Cavan, Ireland. It is in the Roman Catholic Diocese of Kilmore and the Diocese of Kilmore, Elphin and Ardagh.

External links
 Lisball at logainm.ie

Townlands of County Cavan